English Martyrs Church is a Roman Catholic parish church in Tower Hill, London. It was built from 1873 to 1876, by Pugin & Pugin according to designs by their deceased brother, E. W. Pugin. It is located on Prescot Street, close to the Royal College of Psychiatrists. It was founded by the Missionary Oblates of Mary Immaculate and is a Grade II listed building, having been listed in 1982.

History

Foundation
In 1864, the Missionary Oblates of Mary Immaculate were invited to Tower Hill and Kilburn by Cardinal Nicholas Wiseman to start missions serving the local Catholic communities. In 1865, the Oblates arrived and founded those missions. Construction work soon started on a temporary church and school on the church's present site. On 12 December 1866, the temporary church and school were opened by the Archbishop of Westminster, Cardinal Henry Manning. From 1870 to 1872, a new building constructed with a school on the ground floor and a chapel on the first floor.

Construction
On 18 May 1873, the foundation stone for English Martyrs Church was laid by Cardinal Manning. It was designed by E. W. Pugin, but work was delayed because of problems in buying the land and the death of Pugin on 5 June 1875. Pugin's brothers, Cuthbert Welby Pugin and Peter Paul Pugin carried on the work based on E. W. Pugin's designs. On 22 June 1876, Cardinal Manning opened the church. Construction work was done by Lascelles of Bunhill Row, and the cost was £10,000.

Developments
In 1881, the presbytery was rebuilt. The work was paid for by the Carthusians, in commemoration for the Carthusian Martyrs of London, executed at Tower Hill in 1535. In the 1890s, the school next door was enlarged, resulting in the demolition of the original sacristy and the building of a new one in the presbytery. In 1940, during the Second World War, the church was damaged by a 500 kg bomb which fell through the roof, damaged the side wall and destroyed the pulpit, but it did not explode. In 1970, the school was moved to St Mark Street and its old site became a community centre. In 1991, refurbishment work was done to the sanctuary and the church. In 2007, the roof was repaired and the interior repainted.

Parish
In English Martyrs Church, there are three Sunday Masses, at 6:30pm on Saturday and at 9:00am and 11:00am on Sunday.

Interior

See also
 Archdiocese of Westminster

References

External links
 
 

Roman Catholic churches in the London Borough of Tower Hamlets
Buildings and structures in Whitechapel
Churches in the Roman Catholic Diocese of Westminster
Grade II listed churches in London
Gothic Revival church buildings in London
1865 establishments in England
Roman Catholic churches completed in 1876
Missionary Oblates of Mary Immaculate churches in the United Kingdom